The Kanawha sculpin (Cottus kanawhae) is a species of freshwater ray-finned fish belonging to the family Cottidae, the typical sculpins. It is found in the United States, inhabiting the New River of Virginia and West Virginia. It reaches a maximum length of 11.0 cm. It prefers rocky areas of limestone streams and cave streams.

References

Cottus (fish)
Fish described in 2005
Taxa named by Charles Richard Robins